Frank Pike (26 March 1930 – 1 June 2010) was a Canadian soccer player and coach.

Career
Frank Pike was born in Plymouth, England, and played in midfield as an amateur for hometown club Plymouth Argyle F.C

Coaching career
Pike, as a Canadian citizen, began his coaching career in 1955. Coaching professional teams in the late 1950s and early 1960s. In 1964, he managed in the National Soccer League with Toronto Tridents, and Toronto Roma in the Eastern Canada Professional Soccer League. Pike became involved at the national level with the Canadian World Cup Team in 1968. In 1970, Pike was appointed as the National Team Coach for all Canadian teams, participating in International competitions at the Pan American and Olympic Games, World Cup and Youth games. Pike was responsible for the original development of Canadian National teams in international competition, his contributions resulting in vast improvements in the performance and credibility of Canadian soccer teams. In 1974, he took on the position of Provincial coach for the Province of Ontario, being responsible for the development of many players who moved forward to the national team. As Ontario Provincial Coach, he was also responsible for teaching and mentoring other coaches to grow professionalism for the sport in Canada. He also had a brief spell managing Mexican Primera División side Club Jalisco during 1979.

Pike is a recipient of the Achievement Award from the Province of Ontario. His work running coaching clinics in Guadalajara and coaching a team in the Primera División (First Division), as well as during International tournaments in BC, gained him respect amongst his peers.

Personal life
Frank lived comfortably in British Columbia following his retirement from the sport.

References

External links
DT statistics at Medio Tiempo

Canada men's national soccer team managers
Canadian soccer coaches
Soccer people from Ontario
English emigrants to Canada
Plymouth Argyle F.C. players
English footballers
Footballers from Plymouth, Devon
Expatriate football managers in Mexico
1930 births
2010 deaths
Association football midfielders
Canadian National Soccer League coaches
Toronto Blizzard managers